Robert David Mariani (born Robert Eugene Mariani, April 16, 1950) is an American lawyer who serves as a Senior United States district judge of the United States District Court for the Middle District of Pennsylvania.

Early life and education 

Born in Scranton, Pennsylvania, Mariani earned an Artium Baccalaureus degree in 1972 from Villanova University and a Juris Doctor in 1976 from Syracuse University College of Law. Robert Mariani was married to Sallyann Price until her death in 2008. They have three children together, Robert Jr., Christine and Jeanne-Michele.

Professional career 

Out of law school, Mariani worked for three years (from 1976 until 1979) at a now-dissolved, Scranton law firm. He then worked as a partner at a Scranton law firm from 1979 until 1993. From 1993 until his confirmation, Mariani was a lawyer in sole private practice in Scranton, specializing in labor and employment law.

Federal judicial service 

On December 1, 2010, President Obama nominated Mariani to a vacant judicial seat on the United States District Court for the Middle District of Pennsylvania that previously had been held by Judge James Martin Munley, who assumed senior status in January 2009. Mariani never received a Judiciary Committee hearing before the end of 2010, and his nomination lapsed at the end of the year. Obama renominated Mariani on January 5, 2011. On July 21, 2011, the Senate Judiciary Committee reported his nomination to the Senate floor and he was confirmed by the full Senate on October 19, 2011, by a 82–17 vote. He received his commission that same day. He assumed senior status on September 30, 2022.

References

External links

1950 births
Judges of the United States District Court for the Middle District of Pennsylvania
Living people
People from Scranton, Pennsylvania
Syracuse University College of Law alumni
United States district court judges appointed by Barack Obama
21st-century American judges
Villanova University alumni
American people of Italian descent